Catarina is a feminine given name. It is a Portuguese, Spanish and Galician form of the name Katherine. It may refer to:

Portuguese infantas
Infanta Catarina of Portugal (1436–1463), daughter of King Edward of Portugal
Infanta Catarina, Duchess of Braganza (1540–1614), granddaughter of King Manuel I of Portugal and pretender to the Portuguese throne
Catherine of Braganza (1638–1705), wife of King Charles II of Great Britain

Other people
 Catarina Eufémia, illiterate harvester from Alentejo, Portugal who was murdered during a worker's strike
 Catarina Lindqvist, professional tennis player
 Catarina Ruivo, Portuguese film director
 Catarina Rodrigues, Portuguese judoka
 Catarina van Hemessen, Flemish Renaissance painter
 Dona Catarina, Sinhala noble, Queen of the Kingdom of Kandy in 1591 and again from 1594-1604

Feminine given names